San Rocco is a small Baroque-style, Roman Catholic church facing the Piazza dei Cavalieri  in central Pisa, Italy.

History 
The church San Pietro in Cortevecchia is mentioned in documents from 1028. In 1575, a near complete reconstruction occurred when the church was granted to the Company (Order) of Saint Roch (San Rocco). Architect  Cosimo Pugliani added a new façade in 1630–1634. The Order of St. Rocco was suppressed in 1782, and the church soon fell under the care of the diocese, and another restoration occurred in 1899.

The interior has frescos in the niches from the 13th century. The ceiling fresco of St Rocco protecting those affected with the plague is attributed to  Francesco Venturi.

The altar has a crucifixion from the 16th century and a Madonna and child from the 15th century in polychrome terracotta. On the altar on the left nave is a canvas of St Rocco attributed to Giovanni Antonio Sogliani.

References 

Rocco
Roman Catholic churches in Pisa
Roman Catholic churches completed in 1634
1634 establishments in Italy